Stéphanie Öhrström (born 12 January 1987) is a Swedish football goalkeeper, currently playing for AS Roma. in Italy's Serie A where she had previously played for S.S. Lazio Women 2015, Fiorentina and AGSM Verona. Before moving to Italy, she played for LdB Malmö and Jitex BK in the Damallsvenskan.

References

1987 births
Living people
Swedish women's footballers
Expatriate women's footballers in Italy
Damallsvenskan players
FC Rosengård players
Serie A (women's football) players
A.S.D. AGSM Verona F.C. players
Swedish expatriate sportspeople in Italy
Fiorentina Women's F.C. players
Women's association football goalkeepers
S.S. Lazio Women 2015 players
A.S. Roma (women) players
People from Trelleborg
Footballers from Skåne County